The Samarian Spinel is a  spinel gemstone that is the largest of its kind in the world.  It is part of the Iranian Crown Jewels.

Origins
It and a smaller  spinel were captured by the Persian King Nadir Shah during his 18th-century conquest of India.  The smaller of the two spinels bears a 350-year-old inscription attributing its ownership to Jahangir, a Mughal Emperor of India.  Legend states that in response to court criticism for having inscribed his own name on the stone, the Emperor proclaimed "This stone shall make my name more famous than the entire dynasty of Tamerlane!" His prediction proved somewhat correct as the Tamerlane dynasty was overthrown after 230 years, while Jahangir's name lives on inscribed on a number of gemstones found in the Iranian treasury.

The Samarian spinel has a hole in it. According to a diary entry of the court physician to the Iranian Shah Nasser al-Din Shah Qajar, the King told the physician that the stone once adorned the neck of the biblical golden calf, which the Israelites are said to have made while Moses was receiving the Ten Commandments.  A diamond was added later to conceal the hole.

See also
 List of individual gemstones

References

Meen & Tushingham, 1968: Bank Markazi Iran, 1971

External links
 A gemstone account
 Samarian Spinel [picture]

Individual spinels
Iranian National Jewels
Jewels of the Mughal Empire
Tourist attractions in Tehran
Wars involving Afsharid Iran